Shpëtim Duro (born 24 December 1959) is an Albanian professional football coach.

Managerial career
Duro was named the manager of Macedonian First League side FK Shkëndija on 24 November 2013, just 15 hours after the sacking of Gjore Jovanovski. He was first hired as a temporary caretaker manager for the club's next three games, but he signed a contract with the club to be the manager for the remainder of the 2013–14 season.

Duro lead Shkëndija from the relegation zone to a place in the Europa League qualifications, recording 11 wins, 4 draws and only 2 defeats. He managed to beat title contenders Turnovo, Vardar, Metalurg and even the champions Rabotnicki. He was in a 7 games winning run. Although Shkëndija wanted to keep Duro, an offer from Partizani, where his family lives, convinced him to leave Shkëndija. Duro even accepted a lower offer just to be his family back in his hometown Tirana.

On 27 May 2014, he officially rejoined Partizani on a three-year contract.

He replaced Bekim Isufi as manager of Kosovan side Drita in September 2018 and on 25 July 2019, Duro was announced as head coach of Kukësi.

References

External links

1959 births
Living people
Sportspeople from Tirana
Albanian football managers
KF Bylis Ballsh managers
FK Dinamo Tirana managers
KF Apolonia Fier managers
FK Partizani Tirana managers
Besa Kavajë managers
KF Skënderbeu Korçë managers
KF Vllaznia Shkodër managers
FK Shkëndija managers
Flamurtari Vlorë managers
FC Drita managers
FK Kukësi managers
Kategoria Superiore managers
Albanian expatriate football managers
Expatriate football managers in North Macedonia
Albanian expatriate sportspeople in North Macedonia
Expatriate football managers in Kosovo
Albanian expatriate sportspeople in Kosovo